Cheryl Dickey (born December 12, 1966, in Houston, Texas) is a retired American hurdler.

She won the bronze medal at the 1997 World Indoor Championships in Paris.

Her personal best time is 12.72 seconds, achieved in 1998.

References

USATF bio

1966 births
Living people
American female hurdlers
Athletes (track and field) at the 1996 Summer Olympics
Olympic track and field athletes of the United States
People from Houston
21st-century American women
20th-century American women